Myriopteris cooperae, formerly Cheilanthes cooperae,  is a species of lip fern known by the common name Mrs. Cooper's lip fern, or simply Cooper's lip fern.

Description
The rhizomes are short with closely-spaced leaf bases, typically  in diameter, and upright or ascending rather than horizontal. The rhizome bears persistent scales, whose shape ranges from linear-subulate to linear-lanceolate or lanceolate. They are brown or tan to reddish-brown in color, more or less uniform in color or darkening towards the tip.

The fern's leaves are up to about 30 centimeters long and a few wide, and are made up of segments subdivided into pairs of many-lobed smaller segments. They are pale green in color with glandular hairs.

The smallest segments are oval in shape and have sori with tan-colored sporangia on their undersides.

Taxonomy
The species was first described by D. C. Eaton in 1875, from material collected by Sarah Paxon Cooper near Santa Barbara, California and by John Gill Lemmon in Sierra Valley. He named the species for Cooper, according to him the first American fern to be named in honor of a female botanist. By a strict application of the principle of priority, Oliver Atkins Farwell transferred the species to the genus Allosorus as Allosorus cooperae in 1931, that genus having been published before Cheilanthes. Farwell's name was rendered unnecessary when Cheilanthes was conserved over Allosorus in the Paris Code published in 1956.

The development of molecular phylogenetic methods showed that the traditional circumscription of Cheilanthes is polyphyletic. Convergent evolution in arid environments is thought to be responsible for widespread homoplasy in the morphological characters traditionally used to classify it and the segregate genera that have sometimes been recognized. On the basis of molecular evidence, Amanda Grusz and Michael D. Windham revived the genus Myriopteris in 2013 for a group of species formerly placed in Cheilanthes. One of these was C. cooperae, which thus became Myriopteris cooperae. In 2018, Maarten J. M. Christenhusz transferred the species to Hemionitis as H. cooperae, as part of a program to consolidate the cheilanthoid ferns into that genus.

Further molecular studies in Myriopteris demonstrated the existence of three well-supported clades within the genus. M. cooperae belongs to what Grusz et al. informally named the lanosa clade. Within this clade, M. cooperae is sister to all other species except M. viscida, which is sister to M. cooperae plus the rest of the clade. The lanosa clade is distinguished from all other species of the genus, except M. wrightii, by forming fiddleheads as leaves emerge. The basal grade of M. cooperae and M. viscida is distinguished from the rest of the clade by their flattened rachides.

Distribution and habitat
It is endemic to California, where it is widespread but not very common. It can be found growing in crevices in rocky habitat, generally on limestone, in chaparral and other habitats.

See also
California chaparral and woodlands
California interior chaparral and woodlands
Coastal sage scrub

Notes and references

References

Works cited

External links
Calflora Database: Myriopteris cooperae (Cooper's lip fern) — formerly Cheilanthes cooperae.
Jepson Manual eFlora (TJM2) treatment of Myriopteris cooperae — formerly Cheilanthes cooperae.
USDA Plants Profile for Cheilanthes cooperae (Cooper's lip fern)
Flora of North America
UC Photos gallery — Cheilanthes cooperae

cooperae
Ferns of California
Endemic flora of California
Flora of the Sierra Nevada (United States)
Natural history of the California chaparral and woodlands
Natural history of the Santa Monica Mountains
Natural history of the Transverse Ranges